The 2002 UEFA European Under-19 Championship was the first edition of the UEFA European Under-19 Championship, after the previous Under-18 competition was reclassified. The tournament was held in Norway, between 21 July and 28 July 2002. The top three teams from each group qualified for the 2003 FIFA World Youth Championship. Players born on or after 1 January 1983 were eligible to participate in this competition.

The final tournament took place in seven venues located in seven cities — Bærum, Drammen, Hønefoss, Kongsvinger, Lillestrøm, Moss and Oslo. The winners were Spain, who beat Germany to secure their fourth title, and the top scorer was Fernando Torres, with four goals. This edition is also notable for Nelly Viennot becoming the first female official who participated in an UEFA-organised men's football event, after acting as assistant referee at Norway's 1–5 defeat of Slovakia on 21 July 2002.

Qualification

The qualification format consisted of two rounds. In the preliminary round, which took place between August and November 2001, 50 national teams were drawn into 14 groups (six groups of three teams and eight groups of four teams) contested as round-robin mini-tournaments hosted by one of the group teams. The group winners then progressed to the intermediary round, where they were paired and played two-legged ties between March and May 2002. The winners secured qualification for the final tournament, joining Norway who qualified automatically as hosts.

Qualified teams
The following eight teams qualified to the final tournament:

Venues

The final tournament was held in seven stadiums located in seven Norwegian cities.

Match officials
UEFA named six referees for the final tournament:

Squads

Results

Group stage

Group A

Group B

Third place play-off

Final

Goalscorers
4 goals
 Fernando Torres

3 goals

 Dean Ashton
 Jon Daly
 Filip Šebo

2 goals

 Mike Hanke
 Moritz Volz
 Roman Jurko
 José Antonio Reyes

1 goal

 Jonathan Blondel
 Styn Janssens
 Kevin Vandenbergh
 Radek Dosoudil
 Pavel Fořt
 Tomáš Rada
 Václav Svěrkoš
 Darren Carter
 Carlton Cole
 Jerome Thomas
 Philipp Lahm
 David Odonkor
 Sascha Riether
 Piotr Trochowski
 Stephen Brennan
 Stephen Kelly
 Stephen Paisley
 Christian Grindheim
 Tomáš Bruško
 Marek Čech
 Juraj Halenár
 Roman Konečný
 Marián Kurty
 Tomáš Labun
 Tomás Sloboda
 Igor Žofčák
 Andrés Iniesta
 Sergio García

Qualification to World Youth Championship
The six best performing teams qualified for the 2003 FIFA World Youth Championship:

References

External links
Official website at UEFA.com
Match list at rsssf.com

 
2002
2002
2001–02 in European football
2002 in Norwegian football
2001–02 in Spanish football
2001–02 in German football
2001–02 in Slovak football
2001–02 in Republic of Ireland association football
2001–02 in Belgian football
2001–02 in Czech football
2001–02 in English football
July 2002 sports events in Europe
2002 in youth association football